Several Canadian naval units have been named HMCS Comox.

 (I) was a  that served with the Royal Canadian Navy from 1938–1945.
 (II) was a  that served the Royal Canadian Navy from 1954–1957. She was sold to Turkey.

Battle honours
Atlantic 1940–45

Royal Canadian Navy ship names